Hungry Horse is a chain of 284 pub restaurants in England, Wales and Scotland which is owned by Greene King Brewery. It was first established in 1995 and promotes itself as offering low cost meals for families and groups. Work began on a new pub restaurant of the chain with the scheme of Phoenix Riverside at Templeborough in Rotherham in February 2015. 

The chain launched its vegan menu across all the restaurants in the United Kingdom in September 2018. A new winter menu was launched in October 2015, with chefs spending one day at South Cheshire College preparing dishes for the chain’s new winter menu.

Double Doughnut controversy 
The chain was harshly criticised in November 2014 for introducing a new burger the “Double Doughnut” which at 1,996 calories contained nearly 100% of the recommended daily energy intake for adult women. 

It also contains 53g of saturated fat (the recommended daily allowance is 20g for women, and 30g for men) and 8.2g of salt (recommended daily allowance for adults is 6g).

References

External links 
 
 

Restaurant groups in the United Kingdom
Restaurants established in 1995